Ahn Tae-Eun (born September 17, 1985) is a South Korean footballer who is currently without a club. He has previously played for the Pohang Steelers, FC Seoul and Incheon United.

Club career statistics

External links
 
 FIFA Player Statistics

1985 births
Living people
Association football fullbacks
South Korean footballers
FC Seoul players
Pohang Steelers players
Incheon United FC players
K League 1 players
Sportspeople from South Jeolla Province